Brandano is both an Italian name and an Italian surname. Brandano may also refer to:

Names
 Brandano (surname)
 Brandano